Acacia masliniana, commonly known as Maslin's wattle is a shrub of the genus Acacia and the subgenus Plurinerves that is endemic to arid parts of western Australia.

Description
The terete and glabrous branchlets can be hairy at the extremities. Like most species of Acacia it has phyllodes rather than true leaves. It blooms from July to September and produces yellow flowers.

Taxonomy
The shrub is named for the botanist Bruce Maslin. It has similar phyllodes to Acacia kalgoorliensis and superficially resembles Acacia donaldsonii and Acacia rigens.

Distribution
It is native to an area in the Mid West and Goldfields-Esperance regions of Western Australia where it is commonly situated along the margins of marshes and saline lakes and on flats growing in clay or loamy soils as a part of open scrubland communities. It has a scattered distribution with the bulk of the population found between Twin Peaks, Cue, Perenjori and Youanmi with outlying populations found near Kalgoorlie.

See also
List of Acacia species

References

masliniana
Acacias of Western Australia
Plants described in 1993